Naturally occurring lutetium (71Lu) is composed of one stable isotope 175Lu (97.41% natural abundance) and one long-lived radioisotope, 176Lu with a half-life of 3.78 × 1010 years (2.59% natural abundance). Thirty-five radioisotopes have been characterized, with the most stable, besides 176Lu, being 174Lu with a half-life of 3.31 years, and 173Lu with a half-life of 1.37 years. All of the remaining radioactive isotopes have half-lives that are less than 9 days, and the majority of these have half-lives that are less than half an hour. This element also has 18 meta states, with the most stable being 177mLu (t1/2 160.4 days), 174mLu (t1/2 142 days) and 178mLu (t1/2 23.1 minutes).

The isotopes of lutetium range in mass number from 149 to 184. The primary decay mode before the most abundant stable isotope, 175Lu, is electron capture (with some alpha and positron emission), and the primary mode after is beta emission. The primary decay products before 175Lu are isotopes of ytterbium and the primary products after are isotopes of hafnium. All isotopes of lutetium are either radioactive or, in the case of 175Lu, observationally stable, meaning that 175Lu is predicted to be radioactive but no actual decay has been observed.

List of isotopes 

|-
| 149Lu
| style="text-align:right" | 71
| style="text-align:right" | 78
| |
| | 450 ns[(+170−100) μs]
| [proton emission|p
|
| 11/2-
|
|-
| rowspan=2|150Lu
| rowspan=2 style="text-align:right" | 71
| rowspan=2 style="text-align:right" | 79
| rowspan=2|149.97323(54)#
| rowspan=2 data-sort-value='3(ms) 043.5' | 43(5) ms
| p (80%)
| 149Yb
| rowspan=2|(2+)
| rowspan=2|
|-
| β+ (20%)
| 150Yb
|-
| style="text-indent:1em" | 150mLu
| colspan="3" style="text-indent:2em" | 34(15) keV
| data-sort-value='2(μs) 080' | 80(60) μs[30(+95−15) μs]
| [proton emission|p
| 149Yb
| (1, 2)
|
|-
| rowspan=2|151Lu
| rowspan=2 style="text-align:right" | 71
| rowspan=2 style="text-align:right" | 80
| rowspan=2|150.96757682
| rowspan=2 data-sort-value='3(ms) 080.6' | 80.6(5) ms

| p (63.4%)
| 150Yb
| rowspan=2|(11/2−)
| rowspan=2|
|-
| β+ (36.6%)
| 151Yb
|-
| style="text-indent:1em" | 151mLu
| colspan="3" style="text-indent:2em" | 77(5) keV
| data-sort-value='2(μs) 016' | 16(1) μs
| p
| 150Yb
| (3/2+)
|
|-
| rowspan=2|152Lu
| rowspan=2 style="text-align:right" | 71
| rowspan=2 style="text-align:right" | 81
| rowspan=2|151.96412(21)#
| rowspan=2 data-sort-value='3(ms) 650' | 650(70) ms
| β+ (85%)
| 152Yb
| rowspan=2|(5−, 6−)
| rowspan=2|
|-
| β+, p (15%)
| 151Tm
|-
| rowspan=2|153Lu
| rowspan=2 style="text-align:right" | 71
| rowspan=2 style="text-align:right" | 82
| rowspan=2|152.95877(22)
| rowspan=2 data-sort-value='4(s) 000.9' | 0.9(2) s
| α (70%)
| 149Tm
| rowspan=2|11/2−
| rowspan=2|
|-
| β+ (30%)
| 153Yb
|-
| style="text-indent:1em" | 153m1Lu
| colspan="3" style="text-indent:2em" | 80(5) keV
| data-sort-value='4(s) 001' | 1# s
| IT
| 153Lu
| 1/2+
|
|-
| style="text-indent:1em" | 153m2Lu
| colspan="3" style="text-indent:2em" | 2502.5(4) keV
| data-sort-value='2(μs) 000.1' | >0.1 μs
| IT
| 153Lu
| 23/2−
|
|-
| style="text-indent:1em" | 153m3Lu
| colspan="3" style="text-indent:2em" | 2632.9(5) keV
| data-sort-value='2(μs) 015' | 15(3) μs
| IT
| 153m2Lu
| 27/2−
|
|-
| 154Lu
| style="text-align:right" | 71
| style="text-align:right" | 83
| 153.95752(22)#
| data-sort-value='4(s) 001' | 1# s
| β+
| 154Yb
| (2−)
|
|-
| style="text-indent:1em" | 154m1Lu
| colspan="3" style="text-indent:2em" | 58(13) keV
| data-sort-value='4(s) 001.12' | 1.12(8) s
|
|
| (9+)
|
|-
| style="text-indent:1em" | 154m2Lu
| colspan="3" style="text-indent:2em" | >2562 keV
| data-sort-value='2(μs) 035' | 35(3) μs
|
|
| (17+)
|
|-
| rowspan=2|155Lu
| rowspan=2 style="text-align:right" | 71
| rowspan=2 style="text-align:right" | 84
| rowspan=2|154.954316(22)
| rowspan=2 data-sort-value='3(ms) 068.6' | 68.6(16) ms
| α (76%)
| 151Tm
| rowspan=2|(11/2−)
| rowspan=2|
|-
| β+ (24%)
| 155Yb
|-
| rowspan=2 style="text-indent:1em" | 155m1Lu
| rowspan=2 colspan="3" style="text-indent:2em" | 20(6) keV
| rowspan=2 data-sort-value='3(ms) 138' | 138(8) ms
| α (88%)
| 151Tm
| rowspan=2|(1/2+)
| rowspan=2|
|-
| β+ (12%)
| 155Yb
|-
| style="text-indent:1em" | 155m2Lu
| colspan="3" style="text-indent:2em" | 1781.0(20) keV
| data-sort-value='3(ms) 002.7' | 2.70(3) ms
|
|
| (25/2−)
|
|-
| rowspan=2|156Lu
| rowspan=2 style="text-align:right" | 71
| rowspan=2 style="text-align:right" | 85
| rowspan=2|155.95303(8)
| rowspan=2 data-sort-value='3(ms) 494' | 494(12) ms
| α (95%)
| 152Tm
| rowspan=2|(2)−
| rowspan=2|
|-
| β+ (5%)
| 156Yb
|-
| rowspan=2 style="text-indent:1em" | 156mLu
| rowspan=2 colspan="3" style="text-indent:2em" | 220(80)# keV
| rowspan=2 data-sort-value='3(ms) 198' | 198(2) ms
| α (94%)
| 152Tm
| rowspan=2|(9)+
| rowspan=2|
|-
| β+ (6%)
| 156Yb
|-
| rowspan=2|157Lu
| rowspan=2 style="text-align:right" | 71
| rowspan=2 style="text-align:right" | 86
| rowspan=2|156.950098(20)
| rowspan=2 data-sort-value='4(s) 006.8'| 6.8(18) s
| β+
| 157Yb
| rowspan=2|(1/2+, 3/2+)
| rowspan=2|
|-
| α
| 153Tm
|-
| rowspan=2 style="text-indent:1em" | 157mLu
| rowspan=2 colspan="3" style="text-indent:2em" | 21.0(20) keV
| rowspan=2 data-sort-value='4(s) 004.79' | 4.79(12) s
| β+ (94%)
| 157Yb
| rowspan=2|(11/2−)
| rowspan=2|
|-
| α (6%)
| 153Tm
|-
| rowspan=2|158Lu
| rowspan=2 style="text-align:right" | 71
| rowspan=2 style="text-align:right" | 87
| rowspan=2|157.949313(16)
| rowspan=2 data-sort-value='4(s) 010.6' | 10.6(3) s
| β+ (99.09%)
| 158Yb
| rowspan=2|2−
| rowspan=2|
|-
| α (.91%)
| 154Tm
|-
| rowspan=2|159Lu
| rowspan=2 style="text-align:right" | 71
| rowspan=2 style="text-align:right" | 88
| rowspan=2|158.94663(4)
| rowspan=2 data-sort-value='4(s) 012' | 12.1(10) s
| β+ (99.96%)
| 159Yb
| rowspan=2|1/2+#
| rowspan=2|
|-
| α (.04%)
| 155Tm
|-
| style="text-indent:1em" | 159mLu
| colspan="3" style="text-indent:2em" | 100(80)# keV
| data-sort-value='4(s) 010' | 10# s
|
|
| 11/2−#
|
|-
| rowspan=2|160Lu
| rowspan=2 style="text-align:right" | 71
| rowspan=2 style="text-align:right" | 89
| rowspan=2|159.94603(6)
| rowspan=2 data-sort-value='4(s) 036' | 36.1(3) s
| β+
| 160Yb
| rowspan=2|2−#
| rowspan=2|
|-
| α (10−4%)
| 156Tm
|-
| style="text-indent:1em" | 160mLu
| colspan="3" style="text-indent:2em" | 0(100)# keV
| data-sort-value='4(s) 040' | 40(1) s
|
|
|
|
|-
| 161Lu
| style="text-align:right" | 71
| style="text-align:right" | 90
| 160.94357(3)
| data-sort-value='4(s) 077' | 77(2) s
| β+
| 161Yb
| 1/2+
|
|-
| style="text-indent:1em" | 161mLu
| colspan="3" style="text-indent:2em" | 166(18) keV
| data-sort-value='3(ms) 007.3' | 7.3(4) ms
| IT
| 161Lu
| (9/2−)
|
|-
| 162Lu
| style="text-align:right" | 71
| style="text-align:right" | 91
| 161.94328(8)
| data-sort-value='5(min) 01.37' | 1.37(2) min
| β+
| 162Yb
| (1−)
|
|-
| rowspan=2 style="text-indent:1em" | 162m1Lu
| rowspan=2 colspan="3" style="text-indent:2em" | 120(200)# keV
| rowspan=2 data-sort-value='5(min) 01.5' | 1.5 min
| β+
| 162Yb
| rowspan=2|4−#
| rowspan=2|
|-
| IT (rare)
| 162Lu
|-
| style="text-indent:1em" | 162m2Lu
| colspan="3" style="text-indent:2em" | 300(200)# keV
| data-sort-value='5(min) 01.9' | 1.9 min
|
|
|
|
|-
| 163Lu
| style="text-align:right" | 71
| style="text-align:right" | 92
| 162.94118(3)
| data-sort-value='5(min) 03.97' | 3.97(13) min
| β+
| 163Yb
| 1/2(+)
|
|-
| 164Lu
| style="text-align:right" | 71
| style="text-align:right" | 93
| 163.94134(3)
| data-sort-value='5(min) 03.14' | 3.14(3) min
| β+
| 164Yb
| 1(−)
|
|-
| 165Lu
| style="text-align:right" | 71
| style="text-align:right" | 94
| 164.939407(28)
| data-sort-value='5(min) 10.74' | 10.74(10) min
| β+
| 165Yb
| 1/2+
|
|-
| 166Lu
| style="text-align:right" | 71
| style="text-align:right" | 95
| 165.93986(3)
| data-sort-value='5(min) 02.65' | 2.65(10) min
| β+
| 166Yb
| (6−)
|
|-
| rowspan=2 style="text-indent:1em" | 166m1Lu
| rowspan=2 colspan="3" style="text-indent:2em" | 34.37(5) keV
| rowspan=2 data-sort-value='5(min) 01.41' | 1.41(10) min
| EC (58%)
| 166Yb
| rowspan=2|3(−)
| rowspan=2|
|-
| IT (42%)
| 166Lu
|-
| style="text-indent:1em" | 166m2Lu
| colspan="3" style="text-indent:2em" | 42.9(5) keV
| data-sort-value='5(min) 02.12' | 2.12(10) min
|
|
| 0(−)
|
|-
| 167Lu
| style="text-align:right" | 71
| style="text-align:right" | 96
| 166.93827(3)
| data-sort-value='5(min) 51.5' | 51.5(10) min
| β+
| 167Yb
| 7/2+
|
|-
| style="text-indent:1em" | 167mLu
| colspan="3" style="text-indent:2em" | 0(30)# keV
| data-sort-value='5(min) 01' | >1 min
|
|
| 1/2(−#)
|
|-
| 168Lu
| style="text-align:right" | 71
| style="text-align:right" | 97
| 167.93874(5)
| data-sort-value='5(min) 05.5' | 5.5(1) min
| β+
| 168Yb
| (6−)
|
|-
| rowspan=2 style="text-indent:1em" | 168mLu
| rowspan=2 colspan="3" style="text-indent:2em" | 180(110) keV
| rowspan=2 data-sort-value='5(min) 06.7' | 6.7(4) min
| β+ (95%)
| 168Yb
| rowspan=2|3+
| rowspan=2|
|-
| IT (5%)
| 168Lu
|-
| 169Lu
| style="text-align:right" | 71
| style="text-align:right" | 98
| 168.937651(6)
| data-sort-value='6(h) 34.06' | 34.06(5) h
| β+
| 169Yb
| 7/2+
|
|-
| style="text-indent:1em" | 169mLu
| colspan="3" style="text-indent:2em" | 29.0(5) keV
| data-sort-value='4(s) 160' | 160(10) s
| IT
| 169Lu
| 1/2−
|
|-
| 170Lu
| style="text-align:right" | 71
| style="text-align:right" | 99
| 169.938475(18)
| data-sort-value='7(d) 002.012' | 2.012(20) d
| β+
| 170Yb
| 0+
|
|-
| style="text-indent:1em" | 170mLu
| colspan="3" style="text-indent:2em" | 92.91(9) keV
| data-sort-value='3(ms) 670' | 670(100) ms
| IT
| 170Lu
| (4)−
|
|-
| 171Lu
| style="text-align:right" | 71
| style="text-align:right" | 100
| 170.9379131(30)
| data-sort-value='7(d) 008.24' | 8.24(3) d
| β+
| 171Yb
| 7/2+
|
|-
| style="text-indent:1em" | 171mLu
| colspan="3" style="text-indent:2em" | 71.13(8) keV
| data-sort-value='4(s) 079' | 79(2) s
| IT
| 171Lu
| 1/2−
|
|-
| 172Lu
| style="text-align:right" | 71
| style="text-align:right" | 101
| 171.939086(3)
| data-sort-value='7(d) 006.7' | 6.70(3) d
| β+
| 172Yb
| 4−
|
|-
| style="text-indent:1em" | 172m1Lu
| colspan="3" style="text-indent:2em" | 41.86(4) keV
| data-sort-value='5(min) 03.7' | 3.7(5) min
| IT
| 172Lu
| 1−
|
|-
| style="text-indent:1em" | 172m2Lu
| colspan="3" style="text-indent:2em" | 65.79(4) keV
| data-sort-value='2(μs) 000.332' | 0.332(20) μs
|
|
| (1)+
|
|-
| style="text-indent:1em" | 172m3Lu
| colspan="3" style="text-indent:2em" | 109.41(10) keV
| data-sort-value='2(μs) 440' | 440(12) μs
|
|
| (1)+
|
|-
| style="text-indent:1em" | 172m4Lu
| colspan="3" style="text-indent:2em" | 213.57(17) keV
| data-sort-value='1(ns) 150' | 150 ns
|
|
| (6−)
|
|-
| 173Lu
| style="text-align:right" | 71
| style="text-align:right" | 102
| 172.9389306(26)
| data-sort-value='8(a) 1.37' | 1.37(1) y
| EC
| 173Yb
| 7/2+
|
|-
| style="text-indent:1em" | 173mLu
| colspan="3" style="text-indent:2em" | 123.672(13) keV
| data-sort-value='2(μs) 074.2' | 74.2(10) μs
|
|
| 5/2−
|
|-
| 174Lu
| style="text-align:right" | 71
| style="text-align:right" | 103
| 173.9403375(26)
| data-sort-value='8(a) 3.31' | 3.31(5) y
| β+
| 174Yb
| (1)−
|
|-
| rowspan=2 style="text-indent:1em" | 174m1Lu
| rowspan=2 colspan="3" style="text-indent:2em" | 170.83(5) keV
| rowspan=2 data-sort-value='7(d) 142' | 142(2) d
| IT (99.38%)
| 174Lu
| rowspan=2|6−
| rowspan=2|
|-
| EC (.62%)
| 174Yb
|-
| style="text-indent:1em" | 174m2Lu
| colspan="3" style="text-indent:2em" | 240.818(4) keV
| data-sort-value='1(ns) 395' | 395(15) ns
|
|
| (3+)
|
|-
| style="text-indent:1em" | 174m3Lu
| colspan="3" style="text-indent:2em" | 365.183(6) keV
| data-sort-value='1(ns) 145' | 145(3) ns
|
|
| (4−)
|
|-
| 175Lu
| style="text-align:right" | 71
| style="text-align:right" | 104
| 174.9407718(23)
| colspan=3 align=center data-sort-value='9' |Observationally stable
| 7/2+
| 0.9741(2)
|-
| style="text-indent:1em" | 175m1Lu
| colspan="3" style="text-indent:2em" | 1392.2(6) keV
| data-sort-value='2(μs) 984' | 984(30) μs
|
|
| (19/2+)
|
|-
| style="text-indent:1em" | 175m2Lu
| colspan="3" style="text-indent:2em" | 353.48(13) keV
| data-sort-value='2(μs) 001.49' | 1.49(7) μs
|
|
| 5/2−
|
|-
| 176Lu
| style="text-align:right" | 71
| style="text-align:right" | 105
| 175.9426863(23)
| 38.5(7)×109 y
| β−
| 176Hf
| 7−
| 0.0259(2)
|-
| rowspan=2 style="text-indent:1em" | 176mLu
| rowspan=2 colspan="3" style="text-indent:2em" | 122.855(6) keV
| rowspan=2 data-sort-value='6(h) 03.66' | 3.664(19) h
| β− (99.9%)
| 176Hf
| rowspan=2|1−
| rowspan=2|
|-
| EC (.095%)
| 176Yb
|-
| 177Lu
| style="text-align:right" | 71
| style="text-align:right" | 106
| 176.9437581(23)
| 6.6475(20) d
| β−
| 177Hf
| 7/2+
|
|-
| style="text-indent:1em" | 177m1Lu
| colspan="3" style="text-indent:2em" | 150.3967(10) keV
| 130(3) ns
|
|
| 9/2−
|
|-
| style="text-indent:1em" | 177m2Lu
| colspan="3" style="text-indent:2em" | 569.7068(16) keV
| 155(7) μs
|
|
| 1/2+
|
|-
| rowspan=2 style="text-indent:1em" | 177m3Lu
| rowspan=2 colspan="3" style="text-indent:2em" | 970.1750(24) keV
| rowspan=2 data-sort-value='7(d) 160.44' | 160.44(6) d
| β− (78.3%)
| 177Hf
| rowspan=2|23/2−
| rowspan=2|
|-
| IT (21.7%)
| 177Lu
|-
| style="text-indent:1em" | 177m4Lu
| colspan="3" style="text-indent:2em" | 3900(10) keV
| 7(2) min[6(+3−2) min]
|
|
| 39/2−
|
|-
| 178Lu
| style="text-align:right" | 71
| style="text-align:right" | 107
| 177.945955(3)
| 28.4(2) min
| β−
| 178Hf
| 1(+)
|
|-
| style="text-indent:1em" | 178mLu
| colspan="3" style="text-indent:2em" | 123.8(26) keV
| 23.1(3) min
| β−
| 178Hf
| 9(−)
|
|-
| 179Lu
| style="text-align:right" | 71
| style="text-align:right" | 108
| 178.947327(6)
| 4.59(6) h
| β−
| 179Hf
| 7/2(+)
|
|-
| style="text-indent:1em" | 179mLu
| colspan="3" style="text-indent:2em" | 592.4(4) keV
| 3.1(9) ms
| IT
| 179Lu
| 1/2(+)
|
|-
| 180Lu
| style="text-align:right" | 71
| style="text-align:right" | 109
| 179.94988(8)
| 5.7(1) min
| β−
| 180Hf
| 5+
|
|-
| style="text-indent:1em" | 180m1Lu
| colspan="3" style="text-indent:2em" | 13.9(3) keV
| ~1 s
| IT
| 180Lu
| 3−
|
|-
| style="text-indent:1em" | 180m2Lu
| colspan="3" style="text-indent:2em" | 624.0(5) keV
| ≥1 ms
|
|
| (9−)
|
|-
| 181Lu
| style="text-align:right" | 71
| style="text-align:right" | 110
| 180.95197(32)#
| 3.5(3) min
| β−
| 181Hf
| (7/2+)
|
|-
| 182Lu
| style="text-align:right" | 71
| style="text-align:right" | 111
| 181.95504(21)#
| 2.0(2) min
| β−
| 182Hf
| (0,1,2)
|
|-
| 183Lu
| style="text-align:right" | 71
| style="text-align:right" | 112
| 182.95757(32)#
| 58(4) s
| β−
| 183Hf
| (7/2+)
|
|-
| 184Lu
| style="text-align:right" | 71
| style="text-align:right" | 113
| 183.96091(43)#
| 20(3) s
| β−
| 184Hf
| (3+)
|

Lutetium-177

Lutetium (177Lu) chloride, sold under the brand name Lumark among others, is used for radiolabeling other medicines, either as an anti-cancer therapy or for scintigraphy (medical radio-imaging). Its most common side effects are anaemia (low red blood cell counts), thrombocytopenia (low blood platelet counts), leucopenia (low white blood cell counts), lymphopenia (low levels of lymphocytes, a particular type of white blood cell), nausea (feeling sick), vomiting and mild and temporary hair loss.

References 

 Isotope masses from:

 Isotopic compositions and standard atomic masses from:

 Half-life, spin, and isomer data selected from the following sources.

 
Lutetium
Lutetium